Mabbettsville is a settlement in Dutchess County, New York, United States.

The settlement forms one of the most concentrated residential areas of the town, and is the location of Town Park, a baseball field – one of the few recreational areas to the east of Washington. The settlement's main commerce is related to recreation, including dog kennels, antique shops, and a range of home and landscape occupations.

History

The hamlet was previously named "Flikentown" after one of the Great Nine Partners. The new name honours James Mabbett, a commission auctioneer who settled in the hamlet early in the 19th century. In 1937 it consisted of a store, a garage, and a few houses.

References 

Hamlets in New York (state)
Poughkeepsie–Newburgh–Middletown metropolitan area
Hamlets in Dutchess County, New York